Maixant Magloire Mombollet (born 17 January 1981 in Bangui, Central African Republic) is a former college basketball player with The Citadel from 2000-2004. He has played with the Central African Republic national basketball team in  2001, 2003, 2005, 2007 and 2009 FIBA Africa Championships, helping the team to quarterfinal appearances in 2005, 2007, and 2009.  He currently plays power forward for Orcines in the French Professional Basketball League.

References

1981 births
Living people
Central African Republic men's basketball players
People from Bangui
The Citadel Bulldogs basketball players
Power forwards (basketball)